The 2022 Suncorp Super Netball season was the sixth season of the premier netball league in Australia. The season commenced on 26 March and concluded with the Grand Final on 3 July. The defending premiers were the New South Wales Swifts, who narrowly missed out on the finals series. The West Coast Fever won their very first premiership in the club's history, after defeating the Melbourne Vixens 70–59 in the Grand Final.

Teams

Player signings
Important dates in relation to player signings for the 2022 season were:
 6–13 September 2021: Clubs have an exclusive window to re-sign any of their existing contracted players, or any of their existing permanent or temporary replacement players. Clubs can also sign any player who was not contracted to another team, either as a squad member, replacement player or a training partner in 2021.
 13 September – 8 October 2021: The period for free agency signings is open, and players can be contracted by any club without restriction. By 8 October all clubs must have signed 10 senior contracted players to their list.
 9 October – 31 December 2021: Training partners can be signed.

The following table is a list of players who moved clubs/leagues into Super Netball, or were elevated to a permanent position in the senior team during the off-season. It does not include players who were re-signed by their original Super Netball clubs.

Pre-season tournament
 Source: Click here
For the first time since 2019, the pre-season Team Girls Cup competition was staged. The round-robin and playoff tournament was held at the Melbourne Sports Centre from Friday 25 February to Sunday 27 February. The eight Super Netball teams were split into two groups of four and played each of their group opponents once, before playing an inter-group match to determine places from first to eighth.

The tournament was won by the Melbourne Vixens, who defeated the West Coast Fever 45–43 in the final.

Pool A Fixtures

Pool B Fixtures

Finals

Regular season
 Source: Click here

Round 1

Round 2

Round 3

Round 4

Round 5

Round 6

Round 7

Round 8

Round 9

Round 10

Round 11

Round 12

Round 13

Round 14

Ladder

Finals series

Major semi-final

Minor semi-final

Preliminary final

Grand Final

 Grand Final MVP Winner: Sasha Glasgow

Awards
The following players were awarded for their performances in the 2022 season:

 The Player of the Year Award was won by Jhaniele Fowler of the West Coast Fever.
 The Grand Final MVP Award was won by Sasha Glasgow of the West Coast Fever.
 The Rising Star Award was won by Donnel Wallam of the Queensland Firebirds.
 The Joyce Brown Coach of the Year award was won by Stacey Marinkovich of the Diamonds (international).
 The Leading Goalscorer Award was won by Jhaniele Fowler of the West Coast Fever, who scored 929 goals.
 The following players were named in the Super Netball Team of the Year:

Attackers
 Goal Shooter: Jhaniele Fowler(West Coast Fever)
 Goal Attack: Gretel Bueta(Queensland Firebirds)

Midcourters
 Wing Attack: Liz Watson(Melbourne Vixens)
 Centre: Maddy Proud(New South Wales Swifts)
 Wing Defence: Amy Parmenter(Giants Netball)

Defenders
 Goal Defence: Latanya Wilson(Adelaide Thunderbirds)
 Goal Keeper: Shamera Sterling(Adelaide Thunderbirds)

Reserves
 Attack Reserve: Jo Harten(Giants Netball)
 Midcourt Reserve: Kelsey Browne(Collingwood Magpies)
 Defence Reserve: Courtney Bruce(West Coast Fever)

References

External links
 

2022
2022 in Australian netball